Ramanathapuram taluk is a taluk in  the Ramanathapuram district of Tamil Nadu, India. The headquarters is the district seat of Ramanathapuram.

Demographics
According to the 2011 census, the taluk of Ramanathapuram had a population of 414,877 with 210,395 males and 204,482 females. There were 972 women for every 1,000 men. The taluk had a literacy rate of 79.76%. Child population in the age group below 6 years were 19,702 Males and 18,825 Females.

References

Taluks of Ramanathapuram district